Hans Johansson (born 1964) is a Swedish former footballer who played as a forward.

References

Living people
Association football forwards
Swedish footballers
Allsvenskan players
Malmö FF players
1964 births